"Bridge Came Tumbling Down" by Stompin' Tom Connors
"English Bay" by Blue Rodeo
"Expo '86" by Death Cab For Cutie
"Expo in BC" by The Spores
"Fallen Leaves" by Billy Talent
"Dumptruck" by Blind Melon
"Summer Wages" by Ian Tyson
"Vancouver" by Jeff Buckley
"Main & Broadway' by Cub
"Northern Touch" by Rascalz ft. Kardinal Offishall, Thrust, Checkmate, Choclair
"The City You Live in is Ugly" by Young and Sexy
"The Crawl" by Spirit of the West
"Vancouver" by Joey Lau
"Vancouver" by Genesis
"Vancouver Blues" by Tim Hus
"Vancouver B.C." by The Smugglers
"Vancouver Divorce" by Gordon Downie
"Vancouver Town '71" by Rolf Harris
"The Vancouver National Anthem" by Matthew Good
"Pine For The Cedars" by Dan Mangan
"Vancouver Shakedown" by Nazareth
"バンクーバー (Vancouver)" by Superfly
"Wrong Side of the Country" by Old Man Luedecke
"False Creek Change" and "2010" by Said the Whale
"Commercial Drive" by The Gruff
"Black Day in December" by Said the Whale
"Hell" by Tegan and Sara
"The Cure" by Tegan and Sara
"Vancouver, une nuit comme une autre" by Aut'Chose 
"Vancouver" a song and album of the same name by Véronique Sanson
"Vancouver" (Instrumental) by Violent Femmes
"Girl from Vancouver" by Svavar Knutur
"Tropical Rainstorm" by Doug and the Slugs
"Doldrums" by Elbow
"Wreck Beach/Totem Park" by The Zolas
"Effort" by Blue J
"Timezone" by Blue J
"Up Granville" by Peach Pit
"Back To Vancouver" by Funboy Five

References 

Vancouver
Vancouver-related lists
Vancouver
Works about Vancouver